Humphrey Ivo John Southern (born 17 September 1960) is a British Anglican bishop. From 2007 to 2015, he was Bishop of Repton, a suffragan bishop in the Diocese of Derby. In April 2015 he was appointed Principal of Ripon College Cuddesdon, an Anglican theological college.

Early life
Southern was born on 17 September 1960. He was educated at Harrow School, an all-boys public school in London, England. He studied history at Christ Church, Oxford and graduated from the University of Oxford with a Bachelor of Arts (BA) degree in 1982. After a period of study at Ripon College Cuddesdon he was ordained in 1987.

Ordained ministry
His career began with curacies at St Margaret's, Rainham (1986–1990) and St Mary’s Walton-on-the-Hill (1990–1992). After these, he was Vicar of Hale (1992–1996), then Team Rector of the same (1996–1999) and also of Badshot Lea (1997–1999). At the same time he was Ecumenical Officer for the Diocese of Guildford (1992–1999). He was then Team Rector of Tisbury (1999–2001) and of the Nadder Valley Team Ministry (2001–2007), both in the Diocese of Salisbury. He was also Rural Dean of Chalke (2000–2007) and an Honorary Canon and Prebendary of Salisbury Cathedral (2006–2007).

Episcopal ministry
Southern was consecrated a bishop on 31 May 2007 at St Paul's Cathedral and installed as Bishop of Repton on 9 June 2007. On 18 November 2014, it was announced that he would succeed Martyn Percy as Principal of Ripon College Cuddesdon. He took up the appointment on 1 April 2015. He has also been an assistant bishop in the Diocese of Oxford since 2015.

Marriage and adult life
A long-term keeper of the English Bull Terrier which he and his family take on walks, Southern is married to Emma with two daughters.

Styles
 Humphrey Southern Esq (1960–1987)
 The Revd Humphrey Southern (1987–2006)
 The Revd Canon Humphrey Southern (2006–2007)
 The Rt Revd Humphrey Southern (2007–present)

References

1960 births
People educated at Harrow School
Alumni of Christ Church, Oxford
Alumni of Ripon College Cuddesdon
21st-century Church of England bishops
Living people
Bishops of Repton
Staff of Ripon College Cuddesdon